Mont-Tremblant is a city in the Laurentian Mountains of Quebec, Canada, approximately  northwest of Montreal and  northeast of Ottawa, Ontario. The current municipality with city status was formed in 2000. Mont-Tremblant is most famous for its ski resort, the Mont-Tremblant Ski Resort, which is seven kilometres from the village proper, at the foot of a mountain called Mont Tremblant (derived from local Algonquins who referred to it as the "trembling mountain").

Mont-Tremblant has a race track called Circuit Mont-Tremblant. It has hosted or currently hosts Formula One, Can-Am, Trans-Am, and Champ Car World Series competitions and Ironman triathlon, Quebec.

The surrounding area also features hiking, cycling, canoeing, fishing, golfing, ziplines, tennis, running, go-karting, and a host of other outdoor activities.

Since the summer of 2006, Mont-Tremblant has its own senior amateur Canadian football team, the Mystral, and Junior AA ice hockey team, Les Diables (Devils).

History

The area was inhabited by Algonquins before European colonization. It was settled in 1872 by parish priest Antoine Labelle, leading to formal establishment of the parish in 1879. A railway line from Montreal was completed to the village of Saint-Jovite in 1892, and extended to Lac Mercier in 1904. Mont-Tremblant developed around the Lac-Mercier station. In 1905 a hydroelectric dam was erected on the banks of the Ruisseau Clair (Clear River) and the Rivière-du-Diable (Devil's River) providing electricity initially for Saint-Jovite. Principal economic activities were agriculture and logging.

Constructed by Joseph Bondurant Ryan, the ski resort Mont-Tremblant Lodge began operation of their first chair lift in 1939. His family sold the resort in 1965 to a consortium of investors.

In 2002 the four municipalities in the area merged, Ville Saint-Jovite, Paroisse de Saint-Jovite, Mont-Tremblant, and Lac-Tremblant-Nord, becoming the amalgamated Ville de Mont-Tremblant. Afterwards the Municipality of Lac-Tremblant-Nord separated, effective 2006.

Demographics 

Population:
Population in 2021: 10992
Population in 2016: 9646
Population in 2011: 9494
Population in 2006: 8892
Population in 2001: 8317 (adjusted for boundary change)
Population total in 1996:
Mont-Tremblant: 977
Lac-Tremblant-Nord: 4
Saint-Jovite (ville): 4609
Saint-Jovite (parish): 1708
Population in 1991:
Mont-Tremblant: 707
Lac-Tremblant-Nord: 0
Saint-Jovite (ville): 4118
Saint-Jovite (parish): 1275

Language:
French as first language: 86.9%
English as first language: 8%
Other as first language: 2.8%

Education

The city has five elementary schools on its territory, one high school, one professional training school, and one public college.

The Commission scolaire des Laurentides operates French-language schools:
Elementary schools: Fleur-Soleil, L'Odyssée, La Ribambelle, Tournesol, Trois Saisons.
High school: École Polyvalente Curé-Mercure.

The Sir Wilfrid Laurier School Board operates English-language schools:
Saint Agathe Academy in Sainte-Agathe-des-Monts serves students for both elementary and secondary levels.
Arundel Elementary School in Arundel also serves students at the elementary level

Professional training school: Centre Le Florès.

CEGEP: Centre Collégial de Mont-Tremblant (also called CEGEP de Saint-Jerome Mont-Tremblant campus).

See also
Gray Rocks
Mont-Tremblant public transit
Mont Blanc, Quebec

References

External links

Ville de Mont-Tremblant
Official Site
Mont-Tremblant Local Newspaper - Tremblant Express

Incorporated places in Laurentides
Cities and towns in Quebec